Melody Cruise is Slipping Stitches' first full-length release. Michael Monroe of Hanoi Rocks fame appears on the bonus tracks as producer, lyricist, and vocalist.

Track listing

Personnel
Band
 Cashmire Starz – vocals, guitar, keyboard
 Marty Stitch – guitar, vocals, keyboard
 Madison Pulse – bass
 Lexx Avenue – drums

Guests
 Michael Monroe – vocals

2004 debut albums
Slipping Stitches albums